John Wilbye (baptized 7 March 1574September 1638) was an English madrigal composer.

Early life and education
The son of a tanner, he was born at Brome, Suffolk, England. (Brome is near Diss.)

Career
Wilbye received the patronage of the Cornwallis family of Brome Hall.

Wilbye was employed for decades at Hengrave Hall, near Bury St. Edmunds, where he seems to have been recruited in the 1590s by Elizabeth Kitson who was married to the property's owner, Sir Thomas Kitson (or Kytson). The Kitsons also had a long association with the composer Edward Johnson, who was more than twenty years older than Wilbye, and began working at Hengrave in the 1570s.

As well as working in Suffolk, Wilbye was involved with the music scene in London, where the Kitsons kept a town house (first in Austin Friars and from about 1601 in Clerkenwell).  His first book of madrigals was published in London in 1598, the madrigals being described as "newly composed".  The publication was dedicated to Sir Charles Cavendish, whose first wife had been a Kitson.

Wilbye remained in contact with his printer Thomas East. In 1600 Wilbye and Edward Johnson took on a proofreading job for Easte, the first edition of Dowland's Second Book of Songs, as Dowland was abroad.  East died in 1608, and Wilbye's second book of madrigals was printed the following year by East's nephew Thomas Snodham who had served an apprenticeship under his uncle.

Compositions
Hengrave was a recusant household, but little religious music by Wilbye survives, and even less keyboard music (one piece in Clement Matchett's Virginal Book).  His main interest seems to have been madrigals. A set of madrigals by him appeared in 1598, and a second in 1608, the two sets containing sixty-four pieces.

Wilbye is probably the most famous of all the English madrigalists; his pieces have long been favourites and are often included in modern collections. His madrigals include Weep, weep mine eyes, Weep, O mine eyes and Draw on, sweet night. He also wrote the poem, Love not me for comely grace. His style is characterized by delicate writing for the voice, acute sensitivity to the text and the use of "false relations" between the major and minor modes.

Personal life
Wilbye never married. In 1628, on Lady Kitson's death, all the furnishings, books, and musical instruments at Hengrave Hall were settled by her will upon the new owners of the house, first on her daughter Mary Darcy and then upon her granddaughter Penelope. However, Wilbye left Hengrave to live in retirement at Mary Darcy's house in Colchester, where he died. He is buried in the graveyard of Holy Trinity Church, in Colchester town centre.

See also

References

External links

 
 
 Brief biography of Wilbye at HOASM.org
 
 

English classical composers
English madrigal composers
Renaissance composers
English Baroque composers
16th-century English composers
17th-century English composers
People from Brome, Suffolk
1574 births
1638 deaths
17th-century classical composers
English male classical composers
17th-century male musicians